The men's decathlon event at the 2017 European Athletics U23 Championships was held in Bydgoszcz, Poland, at Zdzisław Krzyszkowiak Stadium on 15 and 16 July.

Medalists

Results

Final standings

References

Decathlon
Combined events at the European Athletics U23 Championships